The 1983 NCAA Women's Golf Championships were contested at the second annual NCAA-sanctioned golf tournament to determine the individual and team national champions of women's collegiate golf in the United States. Until 1996, the NCAA would hold just one women's golf championship for all programs across Division I, Division II, and Division III.

The tournament was held at the University of Georgia Golf Course in Athens, Georgia.

TCU won the team championship, the Horned Frogs' first.

Penny Hammel, from Miami (FL), won the individual title.

Individual results

Individual champion
 Penny Hammel, Miami (FL) (284, -12)

Team results

 DC = Defending champion
 Debut appearance

References

NCAA Women's Golf Championship
Golf in Georgia (U.S. state)
NCAA Women's Golf Championship
NCAA Women's Golf Championship
NCAA Women's Golf Championship